Ulan or Wulan is a county of Qinghai Province, China. It is under the administration of Haixi Mongol and Tibetan Autonomous Prefecture. County seat is Xireg.

The name of the county comes from a Mongolian word which means "red".

Climate

Transportation
The county is served by the Qinghai-Tibet Railway, which has a station at the county seat. There is also a freight-only branch to the salt works on the Chaka Salt Lake 
(茶卡盐湖) near Chaka Town (茶卡镇), in the southeastern part of the county.

References

 
County-level divisions of Qinghai
Haixi Mongol and Tibetan Autonomous Prefecture